Brent Park is a retail area of Neasden in the London Borough of Brent, located by the A406 North Circular Road and to the south of Neasden Depot. It includes an IKEA store, along with a Tesco Extra superstore, and bounded by a McDonald's restaurant on the south-west.

Transport
Bus routes 92, 112, 224, 232 and 332 serve the area.

Retail parks in the United Kingdom